Annerys Victoria Vargas Valdez (born August 7, 1981) is a retired female volleyball player from the Dominican Republic, who won four consecutive gold medals at the Central American and Caribbean Games.

Career

2003
She won gold medal with the women's national team at the 2003 Pan American Games in her home town Santo Domingo, Dominican Republic. There she was awarded best server and blocker. Later that year, she won the Best Blocker and bronze medal at the 2003 NORCECA Championship.

2004
She plays as a middle-blocker and competed at the 2004 Summer Olympics for her native country which finished in 11th place.

Playing with the Dominican club Los Cachorros, she finished the 2004 season of the Superior Tournament as the First Runner-Up, after losing to Mirador the final series.

2005
Joined the Puerto Rican professional team Vaqueras de Bayamón from the LVSF for the 2005 season. Being selected among the "Offensive Team".

2006
In her second season with the Bayamón team, Annerys won the "Best Blocker" and "All-Star" for the 2006 season. While playing a game Puerto Rico, where she was such an idol, she lost a shoe and a fan jumped to the court and picked it up, she had to finish the game with just one shoe.

At the volleyball tournament during the 2006 Central American and Caribbean Games, she won the "Most Valuable Player", "Best Blocker" and "Best Server" awards and with her team the gold medal. After a successful 2006 season, she won the Dominican Republic "Volleyball Athlete of the Year" award.

2007
Playing with the Spanish team Grupo 2002 Murcia, win the Supercup, Queen Cup and Spanish Superliga.  After winning the Superliga, she celebrated with her team taking a bath at the Murcia's Plaza Circular. The same season she won the 2007 CEV Top Teams Cup.

2008
She participated at the 2008 FIVB Women's World Olympic Qualification Tournament, and her team finished in 4th place failing to qualify to the 2008 Summer Olympics. She was selected tournament's "Best Blocker".

Won the 2008 CEV Challenge Cup with Vakifbank Gunes Sigorta Stambuł and was awarded "Best Blocker".

2009
Vargas Valdez played with Criollas de Caguas from the Puerto Rican LVSF for the 2009 season, helping her team to reach the quarterfinals.

After winning with her team the gold medal at the 2009 NORCECA Championship qualifying for the very first time to the 2009 World Grand Champions Cup where her team won the bronze medal.

For the 2009/2010 she played for the club Usiminas/Minas, from the Superliga Brasileira de Voleibol.

2010
She finished the 2009/2010 season of the Brazilian Superliga as the 4th best blocker.

With her National Team, she won the gold medal at the 2010 Pan-American Cup held in Rosarito and Tijuana, Mexico.

In Mayagüez, Puerto Rico she were the recipient of the "Best Blocker" award during the volleyball tournament at the 2010 Central American and Caribbean Games won by her home team.

Joined the Dominican Republic club Mirador, to play at the 2010 FIVB World Club Championship, there her team finished in 4th place after being defeated by Bergamo for the Bronze medal. Vargas won the "Best Blocker" award.

2011-retirement
Vargas was selected 2017 Volleyball Player of the Year by her National Federation.

She played the 2018 season at Dominican Republic Superior Volleyball League from the National District, joining the team Caribeñas VC. She became league champion and was awarded Best Blocker. During the 2019 season, she helped Caribeñas VC to win the league second place.

For the 2021/22 season, she joined the Republic of China's Enterprise Volleyball League team CMFC Volleyball, losing the first three weekends for quarantine due to COVID-19 pandemic restrictions in Taiwan. She led her team to qualify to the league's playoff, but they lost 0-3 to Taipei King Whale in the knockout round and could not make it to the semifinals, ranking in fourth place.

Valdez announced her retirement on May 5, 2022, sending a letter to the Female National Teams director, Cristobal Marte, ending a 25 years career, starting in 1998 and having played three Olympic Games, five World Championships, five World Cups, five Pan American Games and five Central American and Caribbean Games.

Clubs
  Simón Bolívar (1996–1998)
  Modeca (1999–2002)
  Los Cachorros (2003–2004)
  Modeca (2005)
  Bameso (2006)
  Vaqueras de Bayamón (2005–2006)
  Grupo 2002 Murcia (2006–2007)
  Vakifbank Gunes Sigorta Stambuł (2007–2008)
  La Romana (2008)
  Criollas de Caguas (2009)
  Usiminas/Minas (2009–2010)
  Mirador (2010)
  Criollas de Caguas (2011–2012)
  Azeryol Baku (2013–2014)
  River Volley Piacenza (2014–2015)
  Caribeñas VC (2018-2019)
  CMFC Volleyball (2021/22)

Awards

Individuals
 2003 Pan-American Games "Best Server"
 2003 Pan-American Games "Best Blocker"
 2003 NORCECA Championship "Best Blocker"
 2005 Puerto Rican League, "Offensive Team"
 2006 Puerto Rican League, "All-Star"
 2006 Puerto Rican League, "Best Blocker"
 2006 Central American and Caribbean Games "Most Valuable Player" 
 2006 Central American and Caribbean Games "Best Blocker" 
 2006 Central American and Caribbean Games "Best Server" 
 2006 Dominican Republic "Volleyball Player of the Year"
 2008 Olympic Qualifier "Best Blocker"
 2007-08 CEV Challenge Cup "Best Blocker"
 2010 Central American and Caribbean Games "Best Blocker" 
 2010 World Club Championship "Best Blocker"
 2012 Summer Olympics NORCECA qualification tournament's "Best Blocker"
 2013 Dominican Republic "Volleyball Player of the Year"
 2013–14 Azerbaijan Super League "Best Blocker"
 2014 Central American and Caribbean Games "Best Middle Blocker"
 2017 Dominican Republic "Volleyball Player of the Year"
 2018 Dominican Republic Superior Volleyball League, "Best Blocker"

Clubs
 2004 Dominican Republic Distrito Nacional Superior Tournament –  Runner-Up, with Los Cachorros
 2006 Spanish Supercup –  Champion, with Grupo 2002 Murcia
 2007 CEV Top Teams Cup –  Champion, with Grupo 2002 Murcia
 2007 Spanish Queen's Cup –  Champion, with Grupo 2002 Murcia
 2007 Spanish Superliga –  Champion, with Grupo 2002 Murcia
 2008 CEV Challenge Cup –  Champion, with VakıfBank Güneş Sigorta Istanbul
 2011 Puerto Rican League –  Champion, with Criollas de Caguas
 2012 Puerto Rican League –  Runner-Up, with Criollas de Caguas
 2013–14 Azerbaijan Super League –  Runner-Up, Azeryol Baku
 2014 Italian Supercup –  Champion, with River Piacenza
 2018 Dominican Republic Superior Volleyball League –  Champion, with Caribeñas VC
 2019 Dominican Republic Superior Volleyball League –  Runner-Up, with Caribeñas VC

References

External links
 FIVB Profile
 Usiminas/Minas Profile
 CEV Profile

1981 births
Living people
Dominican Republic women's volleyball players
Dominican Republic expatriate sportspeople in Spain
Expatriate volleyball players in Spain
Volleyball players at the 2004 Summer Olympics
Volleyball players at the 2012 Summer Olympics
Volleyball players at the 2020 Summer Olympics
Olympic volleyball players of the Dominican Republic
Volleyball players at the 2003 Pan American Games
Volleyball players at the 2007 Pan American Games
Volleyball players at the 2015 Pan American Games
Volleyball players at the 2019 Pan American Games
Medalists at the 2015 Pan American Games
Medalists at the 2019 Pan American Games
Pan American Games gold medalists for the Dominican Republic
Pan American Games bronze medalists for the Dominican Republic
Pan American Games medalists in volleyball
Central American and Caribbean Games gold medalists for the Dominican Republic
Central American and Caribbean Games medalists in volleyball
Competitors at the 2002 Central American and Caribbean Games
Competitors at the 2006 Central American and Caribbean Games
Competitors at the 2010 Central American and Caribbean Games
Competitors at the 2014 Central American and Caribbean Games
Competitors at the 2018 Central American and Caribbean Games
Expatriate volleyball players in the United States
VakıfBank S.K. volleyballers
Expatriate volleyball players in Turkey
Expatriate volleyball players in Brazil
Expatriate volleyball players in Azerbaijan
Expatriate volleyball players in Italy
Middle blockers
Dominican Republic expatriate sportspeople in Italy
Dominican Republic expatriate sportspeople in the United States
Dominican Republic expatriate sportspeople in Puerto Rico
Dominican Republic expatriate sportspeople in Brazil
Dominican Republic expatriate sportspeople in Turkey